The Burn in the Spotlight Tour was the debut concert tour by Canadian singer-songwriter Nelly Furtado, in support of her debut studio album Whoa, Nelly! (2000). The tour visited North America, Europe and Australasia, performing over 90 shows over the course of 13 months. While on this main tour, Furtado also toured as the opening act for David Gray and U2. She was also a supporting act for the Area Festival. The singer also participated in various radio music festivals in the United States.

Opening acts
Citizen Cope 
Swollen Members 
Tegan and Sara

Setlist 
The following setlist was obtained from the concert held on January 30, 2002, at the Paramount Theatre in Seattle, Washington. It does not represent all concerts for the duration of the tour.
"Baby Girl"
"I Will Make U Cry"
"Party"
"Get Ur Freak On (Remix)"
"Well, Well"
"Hey, Man!" / "What's Going On"
"I'm Like a Bird"
"My Love Grows Deeper"
"Legend" / "Scared of You" / "Onde Estás"
"I Feel You"
"Trynna Finda Way" 
"Real Love"
"Turn Off the Light"
"Shit on the Radio (Remember the Days)"

Tour dates

Festivals and other miscellaneous performances
This concert was a part of the "Rubma Festival"
This concert was a part of the "Jingle Ball"
This concert was a part of "O Starry Night"
This concert was a part of the "Jingle Jam"
This concert was a part of the "Not So Silent Night"
This concert was a part of "Kissmas"

Cancellations and rescheduled shows

Box office score data

References

Nelly Furtado concert tours
2001 concert tours
2002 concert tours